Padthaway may refer to the following:

Padthaway, South Australia, a town and a locality
Padthaway Conservation Park, a protected area in South Australia
 Padthaway Estate, a heritage-listed building in Padthaway, South Australia
Padthaway Football Club, an AFL football team in the Kowree-Naracoorte-Tatiara Football League
Pathaway tribe, an alternative name for the Australian indigenous people, the Potaruwutj
Padthaway wine region, a wine region in South Australia